Grande Cache is a hamlet in west-central Alberta, Canada within and administered by the Municipal District of Greenview No. 16. Grande Cache overlooks the Smoky River, is at the northern edge of Alberta's Rockies, and serves as the gateway to the Willmore Wilderness Park. The hamlet held town status prior to 2019.

History 
The New Town of Grande Cache was incorporated on September 1, 1966. The purpose of creating a new town was to open the area for the development of coal mines. New town status allowed the town to use the Government of Alberta as a guarantor for debt.

Construction of Grande Cache began in 1969. By 1971 a hospital, schools, stores, and the first homes were built.

Grande Cache received town status on September 1, 1983.

The community suffered a boom-bust cycle due to the dependence on a single employer that depended on a single commodity: coal. In an attempt to diversify the economy additional industries were encouraged to develop in the area. This included a wood chip plant and a federal prison operated by the Correctional Service of Canada. In recent years, wilderness tourism is an increasing industry.

In September 2018, Grande Cache's Town Council determined that, due to a reduction in population and the subsequent loss in tax revenue, the town was no longer financially sustainable. On September 25, 2018, town residents voted to dissolve the town into a hamlet under the jurisdiction of the Municipal District (MD) of Greenview No. 16. Out of 1,100 ballots cast in the vote, 1,065 were votes in favour of dissolution, 32 were in favour of remaining a town, and 3 ballots were rejected. The dissolution came into effect on January 1, 2019, rendering Grande Cache a hamlet in the Municipal District of Greenview No. 16.

Geography 

The town is built on a plateau that is just below the subalpine level of the Rocky Mountains. The town site is surrounded by three valleys: to the north is the Smoky River; to the west is the Sulphur River; to the south is Victor Lake and Grande Cache Lake. To the east of town is Grande Mountain.

Climate 
Grande Cache experiences a subarctic climate (Köppen climate classification Dfc). Summertime is usually very mild, but can also be very cool or warm depending on the movement of different airmasses in the area. Wintertime is very cold and snowy, lasting from November into March, and sometimes even later.

Demographics 

As a designated place in the 2016 Census of Population conducted by Statistics Canada, Grande Cache had a population of 3,571 living in 1,296 of its 1,759 total private dwellings, a  change from its 2011 population of 4,319.

Attractions 
 Grande Cache Recreation Centre
 Grande Cache Golf and Country Club
 Great Canadian Death Race
 Willmore Wilderness Park
 Grande Cache Tourism & Interpretive Centre

Sports 
Grande Cache is the home of the Canadian Death Race.

Infrastructure 
Grande Cache is the site of the Grande Cache Institution, a medium-security prison.

Transportation 
Grande Cache is connected to Grande Prairie and Hinton via Highway 40. There is a community bus service once a week to Grande Prairie and Hinton. As of November 6, 2020, bus service has been cancelled until further notice. Grande Cache Airport is  outside of town. There are no scheduled flights into Grande Cache Airport. The airport closed as of January 2017.

Education 
Local schools in Grande Cache include:
Sheldon Coates Elementary School (K-3);
Summitview School (grades 4-8);
SonRise Christian School (K-6) (Closed in 22/23 year); 
Grande Cache Community High School (grades 9-12);

Notable people 
Dean McAmmond, professional hockey player
Travis Roche, professional hockey player

See also 

List of communities in Alberta
List of former urban municipalities in Alberta
List of hamlets in Alberta

References

External links 

1966 establishments in Alberta
2019 disestablishments in Alberta
Designated places in Alberta
Former towns in Alberta
Former new towns in Alberta
Hamlets in Alberta
Municipal District of Greenview No. 16
Populated places disestablished in 2019